The Silent Invasion is a low budget 1962 British film.

Plot
During WW II, a German garrison is stationed in the small French town of Mereux. French local Maria falls in love with German captain Eric Von Strafen. However, the romance comes to an abrupt end when her brother, a saboteur working for the Resistance, is killed. Maria now vows to exact revenge and to help the French Resistance any way she can.

Cast
 Eric Flynn as Erik von Strafen
 Petra Davies as Maria
 Francis de Wolff as Emile
 Martin Benson as S.S. Borge
 Melvyn Hayes as Jean
 Warren Mitchell as Robert 
 Guy Deghy as Pierre
 Noel Dyson as Mme. Veroux
 André Maranne as Argen
 Jan Conrad as Sgt. Major
 John Serret as Jacques
 C. Denier Warren as Gillie 
 Max Faulkner as Curt 
 André Muller as Wilhelm

Critical reception
TV Guide thought the film "overwrought and too unrealistic to be taken seriously."

References

External links

1962 films
British war drama films
1962 drama films
Films about the French Resistance
British black-and-white films
1960s English-language films
1960s British films